Psoronaias is a genus of freshwater mussels, aquatic bivalve mollusks in the subfamily Ambleminae of the family Unionidae, the river mussels.

Species
 Psoronaias crocodilorum (P.M.A. Morelet, 1849) (synonym: Unio crocodillorum P.M.A. Morelet, 1849)
 Psoronaias distincta (Crosse & P. Fischer, 1893)
 Psoronaias guatemalensis (Simpson, 1900)
 Psoronaias herrerae (Marshall, 1923)
 Psoronaias kuxensis Frierson, 1917
 Psoronaias martensi Frierson, 1927
 Psoronaias ostreata (Morelet, 1849)
 Psoronaias percompressa (E. von Martens, 1887)
 Psoronaias profunda (Simpson, 1914)
 Psoronaias quadrata (Simpson, 1914)
 Psoronaias salinarum (Haas, 1929)
 Psoronaias semigranosa (Philippi, 1843)
 Psoronaias usumasintae (Crosse & P. Fischer, 1893)
Synonyms
 Psoronaias crocodilorum (P.M.A. Morelet, 1849): synonym of Psoronaias semigranosa (Philippi, 1843)

References

External links
 Fischer, P. & Crosse, H. (1870-1902). Études sur les mollusques terrestres et fluviatiles du Mexique et du Guatemala. Mission scientifique au Mexique et dans l'Amerique Centrale. Recherches zoologiques, Partie 7 
 Graf, D.; Cummings, K. (2019). Musselp database: The Freshwater Mussels (Unionoida) of the World (and other less consequential bivalves)

Unionidae
Bivalve genera